Crippler or Cripplers may refer to:

 Any disease such as Poliomyelitis with a disabling effect
 cripplers, small bore guns excluded from grouse shooting
 Horse Crippler cactus, Echinocactus texensis
 Crippler (comics), a fictional character in Marvel Comics
 The Crippler, nickname of professional wrestler Chris Benoit
 The Crippler, nickname of professional wrestler Ray Stevens
 The Crippler, nickname of mixed martial artist Chris Leben
 Cripplers (EP), by the hardcore punk band This Is Hell. 
 Cripplers, a possible etymology of the Crips street gang